June 24 - Eastern Orthodox Church calendar - June 26

All fixed commemorations below celebrated on July 8 by Orthodox Churches on the Old Calendar.

For June 25th, Orthodox Churches on the Old Calendar commemorate the Saints listed on June 12.

Saints
 Virgin-martyrs Libya, Leonis, and Eutropa, of Palermo in Sicily (303)
 Virgin-martyr Febronia of Nisibis (304)
 Martyr Gallicanus the Patrician, in Egypt (362)
 Martyrs Orentius, Pharnacius, Eros, Firmus, Firminus, Cyriacus, and Longinus, near Lazica (4th century)  (see also: June 24 )
 Venerable Symeon of Sinai (5th century)
 Venerable Martyrios, Bishop.

Pre-Schism Western saints
 Saint Prosper of Reggio, Bishop of Reggio in Emilia in Italy (c. 466)
 Saint Maximus of Turin, Bishop of Turin during the barbarian invasions of the north of Italy (470)
 Saint Salomon of Cornwall, by tradition born in Cornwall, the husband of St Gwen and father of St Cuby (Cybi), he lived in Brittany and was murdered by heathen (5th century)
 Saint Gallicanus II, fifth Bishop of Embrun in France (c. 541)
 Saint Moluac (Moluag, Molonachus, Moloc of Mortlach), a disciple of St Brendan, he became Bishop of Lismore in Argyle in Scotland, Apostle to the Picts (592)
 Saint Selyf (Selyr, Levan), a hermit in St Levan in Cornwall (6th century)
 Saint Adalbert of Egmond, hierodeacon (710 or 740)
 Virgin-martyr Eurosia (Orosia), at Jaca, Spain (714)
 Saint Gohardus, Bishop of Nantes in France, martyred by raiding Normans while celebrating the liturgy (843)
 Saint Solomon III, King of Brittany, a brave warrior against Franks and Northmen alike, martyr (874)

Post-Schism Orthodox saints
 Venerables Holy Prince Peter and Princess Febronia (tonsured David and Euphrosyne), wonderworkers of Murom (1228)
 Saint Theoleptus of Philadelphia, Metropolitan of Philadelphia (1322)
 Venerables Dionysius (c. 1389) and Dometius (1405-1410) of Dionysiou Monastery, Mount Athos.
 Saint Dalmatus, founder of the Dormition Monastery in Siberia (1697)
 Venerable Methodios of Nyvritos, near Gortyn in Crete, ascetic (17th century)
 New Monk-martyr Procopius of Varna and Mt. Athos, at Smyrna (1810)
 New Martyr George of Attalia, at Krene in Asia Minor (1823)
 Saint Cyprian, hieromonk of Svyatogorsk Monastery (1874)

New martyrs and confessors
 New Hieromartyr Basil Militsyn, Priest (1918)
 New Hiero-confessor Nikon (Belyaev), Hieromonk of Optina Monastery (1931)
 New Hieromartyr Basil Protopopov, Priest (1940)

Other commemorations
 Repose of Hierodeacon Serapion of Glinsk Hermitage (1859)

Icon gallery

Notes

References

Sources
 June 25/July 8. Orthodox Calendar (PRAVOSLAVIE.RU).
 July 8 / June 25. HOLY TRINITY RUSSIAN ORTHODOX CHURCH (A parish of the Patriarchate of Moscow).
 June 25. OCA - The Lives of the Saints.
 The Autonomous Orthodox Metropolia of Western Europe and the Americas (ROCOR). St. Hilarion Calendar of Saints for the year of our Lord 2004. St. Hilarion Press (Austin, TX). p. 47.
 The Twenty-Fifth Day of the Month of June. Orthodoxy in China.
 June 25. Latin Saints of the Orthodox Patriarchate of Rome.
 The Roman Martyrology. Transl. by the Archbishop of Baltimore. Last Edition, According to the Copy Printed at Rome in 1914. Revised Edition, with the Imprimatur of His Eminence Cardinal Gibbons. Baltimore: John Murphy Company, 1916. pp. 184–186.
 Rev. Richard Stanton. A Menology of England and Wales, or, Brief Memorials of the Ancient British and English Saints Arranged According to the Calendar, Together with the Martyrs of the 16th and 17th Centuries. London: Burns & Oates, 1892. pp. 288–290.
Greek Sources
 Great Synaxaristes:  25 ΙΟΥΝΙΟΥ. ΜΕΓΑΣ ΣΥΝΑΞΑΡΙΣΤΗΣ.
  Συναξαριστής. 25 Ιουνίου. ECCLESIA.GR. (H ΕΚΚΛΗΣΙΑ ΤΗΣ ΕΛΛΑΔΟΣ). 
  25 Ιουνίου. Αποστολική Διακονία της Εκκλησίας της Ελλάδος (Apostoliki Diakonia of the Church of Greece).
  25/06/2018. Ορθόδοξος Συναξαριστής. 
Russian Sources
  8 июля (25 июня). Православная Энциклопедия под редакцией Патриарха Московского и всея Руси Кирилла (электронная версия). (Orthodox Encyclopedia - Pravenc.ru).
  25 июня по старому стилю / 8 июля по новому стилю. Русская Православная Церковь - Православный церковный календарь на 2017 год.
  25 июня (ст.ст.) 8 июля 2014 (нов. ст.). Русская Православная Церковь Отдел внешних церковных связей. (DECR).

June in the Eastern Orthodox calendar